Scatterlings is a studio album by Juluka, a South African band led by Johnny Clegg and Sipho Mchunu. It was released in 1982.

The album contains "Scatterlings of Africa", arguably the band's biggest hit (which would be re-recorded to more international success by Juluka's successor band, Savuka).

Critical reception
Robert Christgau wrote that "being a folkie in South Africa takes a lot more guts than it does in liberal societies, and that's audible all over this album—as are the melodic resources of the Zulu tradition, which happen to be vocal rather than percussive." The Globe and Mail wrote that "the music is an unusual and immensely attractive hybrid of tuneful late sixties English folk (in the Fairport Convention, Renaissance mode) with African rhythms." The Philadelphia Inquirer thought that the band members "are to African music what Crosby, Stills & Nash are to American—namely, wimpy, sappy and awful."

Track listing

Original South African Vinyl Release
 "Siyayilanda" (Clegg) – 3:43
 "Kwela Man" (Clegg) – 3:54
 "Simple Things" (Clegg, Mchunu)  – 3:57
 "iJwanasibeki" (Clegg) – 4:50
 "Two Humans on the Run" (Clegg) – 4:41
 "Scatterlings of Africa" (Clegg) – 5:50
 "Spirit is the Journey" (Clegg, Mchunu) – 4:40
 "Digging for Some Words" (Clegg) – 4:12
 "Shake My Way" (Mchunu) – 3:43
 "Mad Dog" (Clegg) – 3:29

International Release
 "Scatterlings of Africa"
 "Spirit is the Journey"
 "Umbaqanga Music" (Clegg)
 "Digging for Some Words"
 "Shake My Way"
 "Siyayilanda"
 "Kwela Man"
 "Simple Things"
 "I Jwanasibeki"
 "Two Humans on the Run"

Re-issue
 "Siyayilanda" - 3:57
 "Kwela Man" - 3:53
 "Simple Things" - 4:12
 "I Jwanasibeki" - 4:49
 "Two Humans on the Run" - 4:38
 "Scatterlings of Africa" - 5:33
 "Spirit is the Journey" - 4:38
 "Digging for Some Words" - 4:10
 "Shake my Way" - 3:41
 "Mad Dog" - 4:25

Personnel
 Johnny Clegg - vocals, guitar
 Sipho Mchunu - guitar, percussion, vocals
 Gary Van Zyl - bass guitar, percussion, vocals
 Zola Mtiya - drums, percussion, vocals
 Tim Hoare - keyboards, vocals
 Scorpion Madondo - flute, vocals

Additional personnel
 Mike Faure - saxophone (on "Simple Things" and "Spirit is the Journey")
 Mike Makhalemele - saxophone (on "Siyayilanda")
 Glenda Millar - keyboards, synthesisers (on "Umbaqanga Music")

References

External links
Juluka discography, accessed May 14, 2006

Juluka albums
1982 albums